Louis VI may refer to:

 Louis VI of France, "the Fat" (1081–1137)
 Louis VI the Roman (1328–1365), Duke of Bavaria and Elector of Brandenburg
 Louis VI, Elector Palatine (ruled 1576–1583)
 Louis VI of Hesse-Darmstadt (ruled 1661–1678)
 Louis VI, Prince of Condé (1756–1830).